Raúl Mendiola (born May 18, 1994) is a Mexican professional footballer who currently plays as an attacking midfielder.

Career
Born in Ciudad Juárez, Mexico, Mendiola joined the LA Galaxy Academy in 2011. While at the academy level Mendiola won back-to-back U-16 Development Academy Player of the Year awards after the 2009–10 and 2010–11 seasons, playing for California-based development academy club Arsenal FC.

On February 20, 2014, it was announced that Mendiola was signed as a homegrown player by the Galaxy. He then made his professional debut with the LA Galaxy II, the reserve side of the LA Galaxy, on March 22, 2014, in the side's first ever USL Pro match against the Orange County Blues. His first appearance with the LA Galaxy first team came on May 17, 2014, in a regular season MLS match against the Houston Dynamo.

On May 31, 2018, Mendiola joined United Soccer League side Las Vegas Lights.

Mendiola joined USL Championship side Reno 1868 on December 10, 2018.

On July 23, 2020, Las Vegas Lights Head Coach Frank Yallop announced that Mendiola would reunite with the team for the remainder of the 2020 season. Mendiola had signed with the San Diego Loyal in January 2020.

Career statistics

Honors
LA Galaxy
MLS Cup: 2014

References

External links 
 

1994 births
Living people
Association football forwards
Expatriate soccer players in the United States
Footballers from Chihuahua
Homegrown Players (MLS)
LA Galaxy players
LA Galaxy II players
Las Vegas Lights FC players
Major League Soccer players
Mexican expatriate footballers
Mexican footballers
Reno 1868 FC players
San Diego Loyal SC players
Sportspeople from Ciudad Juárez
USL Championship players